Franklin Township is one of thirteen townships in Owen County, Indiana, United States. As of the 2010 census, its population was 1,269 and it contained 551 housing units.

History
Franklin Township was founded in 1819.

Geography

Unincorporated towns
 Adel at 
 Farmers at 
 Freedom at 
 New Hope at 
 Pottersville at 
 Vilas at 
(This list is based on USGS data and may include former settlements.)

Cemeteries
The township contains these eighteen cemeteries: Adel, Burkett, Burton, Camden, Defore, Franklin, Hicks, Leach, Light, McIndoo, McKee, Neeley, Oliphant, Pryor, Scott, Waker, White and White.

Major highways
  U.S. Route 231
  Indiana State Road 67

School districts
 Spencer-Owen Community Schools

Political districts
 State House District 46
 State Senate District 39

References
 
 
 IndianaMap

External links
 Indiana Township Association
 United Township Association of Indiana
 City-Data.com page for Franklin Township

Townships in Owen County, Indiana
Townships in Indiana